The Guelph Gryphons football team represents the University of Guelph in Guelph, Ontario in the sport of Canadian football in the Ontario University Athletics conference of U Sports. The Guelph Gryphons football team has been in continuous operation since 1950. The team has won one Vanier Cup national championship in 1984, which is also their only appearance in the title game. The Gryphons are the only program with a perfect record in Vanier Cup games. The team has also won four Yates Cup conference championships, in 1984, 1992, 1996 and 2015.

History
The team can trace their roots back to 1950 when the team played in the Intercollegiate Intermediate Football Union. Through numerous league evolutions, the Gryphons were a founding member of the Ontario University Athletics in 1980 and continue to play there to this day. The team won their first Yates Cup championship in 1984 and also won their first and only Vanier Cup championship that year against the Mount Allison Mounties. While the team was competitive in the 1990s and won two more Yates Cup championships in 1992 and 1996, the 1984 Vanier Cup was the program's only appearance in the title game.

In the early 2000s, the program remained largely in the middle of the standings as the team had been at or within one game of .500 for six of those years and did not have a winning record at any point in the decade. However, led by then-head coach Kyle Walters, the upstart 4-4 Gryphons made a Yates Cup appearance in the 2007 OUA championship game, but lost to the Western Mustangs.

Stu Lang was named head coach for the 2010 season and the program established a dominant run. The team finished with a 7–1 record and a 2nd-place finish for four straight seasons from 2012 to 2015, culminating in the program's fourth Yates Cup win in 2015.

Lang resigned after the successful 2015 season and Kevin MacNeill was named interim head coach for 2016. In the fall of 2017, the football team officially opened the Football Pavilion, a state of the art locker room and complex for the football team, and its coaches, donated by Lang. The team continued to qualify for the playoffs and remain competitive under MacNeill, finishing 5–3 in 2017. However, the team was blown out in a 66-12 OUA semi-final loss to the Western Mustangs. After MacNeill left the program, Todd Galloway was named interim head coach for the 2018 season and led the team all the way to the Yates Cup where they were again soundly defeated by the Mustangs. Ryan Sheahan was named head coach on January 10, 2019 and led the team to a 6–2 record and third-place finish in his first season.

Recent season results

National award winners
J. P. Metras Trophy: Peter Langford (1982), Louie Godry (1986)
Presidents' Trophy: John Rush (2015)
Peter Gorman Trophy: John Lowe (1978)
Russ Jackson Award: Zach Androschuk (2012)
Frank Tindall Trophy: Dan McNally (1996)

Guelph Gryphons in the CFL

As of the end of the 2022 CFL season, 13 former Gryphons players are on CFL teams' rosters:
A. J. Allen, Saskatchewan Roughriders
Johnny Augustine, Winnipeg Blue Bombers
Jared Beeksma, Hamilton Tiger-Cats
Alain Cimankinda, Ottawa Redblacks
Jaylan Guthrie, Edmonton Elks
Royce Metchie, Toronto Argonauts
Curtis Newton, Hamilton Tiger-Cats
Kosi Onyeka, Saskatchewan Roughriders
Jacob Scarfone, BC Lions
Kian Schaffer-Baker, Saskatchewan Roughriders
Kiondre Smith, Hamilton Tiger-Cats
Eric Starczala, Ottawa Redblacks
Coulter Woodmansey, Hamilton Tiger-Cats

References

External links
 Official website

 
 
U Sports teams
U Sports football teams
Sport in Guelph
University of Guelph